Drosophila pseudoobscura is a species of fruit fly, used extensively in lab studies of speciation. It is native to western North America.

In 2005, D. pseudoobscura was the second Drosophila species to have its genome sequenced, after the model organism Drosophila melanogaster.

Allopatric speciation has been induced by reproductive isolation in D. pseudoobscura after only eight generations using different food types, starch and maltose.

Polyandry 
Female Drosophila pseudoobscura are polyandrous, meaning they mate with more than one male. By mating with multiple males, polyandrous females have more genetically diverse offspring.

Fitness benefits

Prevention of extinction 
In the D. pseudoobscura population, some males have a harmful chromosome called sex ratio (SR), where an inactive Y-chromosome is transmitted. If an SR male mates with a female, the female will produce only daughters. Monandry allows the spread of SR and increases the extinction risk in species having SR genes because the SR driver can spread quickly, enriching populations for females. Polyandry decreases the SR gene frequency because the non-SR male sperm outcompete the SR male sperm. Therefore, polyandry results in a decreased risk of extinction in the population.

Increased net offspring survival 
Monandrous female D. pseudoobscura do not obtain sufficient sperm or a plenty of suitable sperm for the fertilization. Even though monandrous female experiencing multiple copulations can produce more eggs than polyandrous female experiencing multiple copulations, monandrous females produce less offspring that survive into adulthood than polyandrous females do. This means that polyandrous females have higher egg-to-adult survival ratio than monandrous females, making the polyandrous females more fit.

Mate selection as a fitness benefit 
Polyandrous relationships benefit females D. pseudoobscura. In males D. pseudoobscura, the variation in number of sperms shows the difference in benefits between polyandrous and monandrous females. Males D. pseudoobscura ejaculate more sperm than any other Drosophila species, and it provides important nourishing factors to females and their offspring. The offspring viability benefits are increased by multiple and variable sperms through ejaculates. There are no additional costs to polyandrous females, because there are not big differences in life expectancy between monandrous female experiencing multiple copulations and polyandrous female experiencing multiple copulations.

Evolutionary consequences 
Polyandry, in general, may have a few fitness consequences. Densely populated areas may have lower rates of polyandry due to environmental restraints such as geographic location and limited resources. This can greatly limit the survival and reproduction of offspring. Therefore, in population dense areas, polyandrous behavior may actually be a fitness consequence since the environment significantly controls the number of offspring that survive.

Polyandry could also pose genetic fitness consequences. Polyandry does not always result in the spread of the most adaptive genes. For example, some individuals may appear to be attractive due to genes that code for increased pheromone production. As a result, attractive individuals are more likely to reproduce more often. However, since these individuals do not always contain adaptive genes, multiple mating events do not always result in the propagation of adaptive genes.

Pheromones 
Ehrman et al made extensive studies of D. pseudoobscura males' mating pheromones  both as isolate and as whole body extracts  in the 1970s. In Leonard et al 1974 (a) they find the female response to male extract to be so linear as to be usable to assay for male pheromone content of an arbitrary extract.

Strains 
Strains in common laboratory use include:
 or CH. Differs from AR only by a third chromosome inversion.
 or AR. Differs from CH only by an inversion on the third chromosome.

References

External links 

 Drosophila pseudoobscura at FlyBase
 Drosophila pseudoobscura at Ensembl Genomes Metazoa
 

pseudoobscura
Insects described in 1929
Diptera of North America